The ceremonial county of Cambridgeshire (which includes the area of the Peterborough unitary authority) is divided into seven parliamentary constituencies. There are two borough constituencies and five county constituencies, which each elect one Member of Parliament to represent it in the Parliament of the United Kingdom.

Constituencies

2010 boundary changes 
The 2007 report of the Boundary Commission for England retained the same seven constituencies that had existed since the 1997 election, with minor boundary changes to align with current local government wards and to better equalise the electorates. These changes, which were implemented at the 2010 general election, included the transfer back of Thorney and Eye from North East Cambridgeshire to Peterborough, the return of the Cambridge ward of Trumpington from South Cambridgeshire to the Cambridge constituency, and small transfers of rural wards from North West Cambridgeshire to Huntingdon, and from South East Cambridgeshire to South Cambridgeshire.

Proposed boundary changes 
See 2023 Periodic Review of Westminster constituencies for further details.

Following the abandonment of the Sixth Periodic Review (the 2018 review), the Boundary Commission for England formally launched the 2023 Review on 5 January 2021. Initial proposals were published on 8 June 2021 and, following two periods of public consultation, revised proposals were published on 8 November 2022. Final proposals will be published by 1 July 2023.

The commission has proposed that the number of seats in Cambridgeshire be increased from 7 to 8, with the creation of the constituency of St Neots and Mid Cambridgeshire, resulting in significant changes to Huntingdon, North West Cambridgeshire, South Cambridgeshire and South East Cambridgeshire (to be renamed East Cambridgeshire). The following seats are proposed:

Containing electoral wards in Cambridge

 Cambridge
 South Cambridgeshire (part)

Containing electoral wards in East Cambridgeshire

 East Cambridgeshire (part)

Containing electoral wards in Fenland

 North East Cambridgeshire

Containing electoral wards in Huntingdonshire

 Huntingdon
 North West Cambridgeshire (part)
 St Neots and Mid Cambridgeshire (part)

Containing electoral wards in Peterborough

 North West Cambridgeshire (part)
 Peterborough

Containing electoral wards in South Cambridgeshire

 East Cambridgeshire (part)
 St Neots and Mid Cambridgeshire (part)
 South Cambridgeshire (part)

Results history 
Primary data source: House of Commons research briefing - General election results from 1918 to 2019

2019 
The number of votes cast for each political party who fielded candidates in constituencies comprising Cambridgeshire in the 2019 general election were as follows:

Percentage votes 

11983 & 1987 - SDP-Liberal Alliance

* Included in Other

Seats 

11983 & 1987 - SDP-Liberal Alliance

Maps

Timeline

Historical representation by party 
A cell marked → (with a different colour background to the preceding cell) indicates that the previous MP continued to sit under a new party name.

1885 to 1918

1918 to 1950

1950 to 1983 

1transferred from Northamptonshire

1983 to present

See also
List of parliamentary constituencies in the East of England (region)
History of parliamentary constituencies and boundaries in Cambridgeshire
Parliamentary representation from Cambridgeshire
Parliamentary representation from Huntingdonshire

Notes

References

Cambridgeshire
Cambridgeshire
Politics of Cambridgeshire
Parliamentary constituencies